Independent's Day is the third studio album by American rapper Royce da 5'9". It was released on June 28, 2005 through M.I.C Records. Production was handled by K.I.D.D., Great Scott, Nottz, Asar, and Carlos "6 July" Broady, who also served as executive producer together with Akino Childrey and Royce. It features guest appearances from Ingrid Smalls, Street Lord Juan, Big Herk, Blade Icewood, CeeLo Green, Jay Black, K-Doe, Kid Vishis, La the Darkman, Sara Stokes and Yo Gotti.

Recording
Main recording sessions took place at MPA Studios in Canton, Michigan. According to Royce, "Independent's Day is not just this album's title. It's a mind state. All the artists chosen to be collaborators are unsigned or independent and have been bubbling. We plan to take that underground buzz and put them over the radar".

Track listing

Personnel

Ryan "Royce da 5'9"" Montgomery – main artist, executive producer
Amery "Big Herk" Dennard – featured artist (track 3)
DaJuan Wren – featured artist (tracks: 3, 7, 17)
Ingrid Smalls – featured artist (tracks: 3, 6, 10, 12, 18)
Sara Stokes – featured artist (track 4)
Breezy Brie – featured artist (track 4)
Squeeze – featured artist (track 4)
Thomas "CeeLo Green" Callaway – featured artist (track 5)
Mario "Yo Gotti" Mims – featured artist (track 6)
Marcus "Kid Vishis" Montgomery – featured artist (track 7)
Darnell "Blade Icewood" Lyndsey – featured artist (track 10)
Jay Black – featured artist (track 10)
June a.k.a. Jah The 5'9 – featured artist (track 12)
Làson "La the Darkman" Jackson – featured artist (track 16)
Ernie K-Doe – featured artist (track 17)
Chuck Alkazian – additional live drums (track 2), mixing (tracks: 2-7, 9, 10, 12-14, 16-18)
Carlos "Six July" Broady – producer (tracks: 2, 6, 13, 14, 18), mixing (tracks: 2-7, 9, 10, 12-14, 17, 18), executive producer
K.I.D.D. – producer (tracks: 3, 7, 10, 12)
Walter "Great" Scott – producer (tracks: 4, 17)
James Terry – co-producer (tracks: 4, 17)
Dominick "Nottz" Lamb – producer (tracks: 5, 9)
Jason "Asar" Qualls – producer (track 16), recording (tracks: 2, 4, 6, 10, 12-14, 16), engineering
Ryan "West" Hyland – recording (tracks: 3-5, 7, 9, 10, 12, 17), engineering
Rob Nelson – recording (track 18)
Larry Nix – mastering
Akino "Kino" Childrey – executive producer
Delmore Uto – artwork, design
Jeremiah "DJ Mumbles" Otto – artwork, design
Brian Horn – photography
Scottie Rosner – A&R
Kefing "KC" Cowans – A&R

References

External links

2005 albums
Royce da 5'9" albums
Albums produced by Nottz